Choudhary Piara Singh is an Indian politician and member of  Bharatiya Janta Party from Jammu and Kashmir. Singh was a member of the Jammu and Kashmir Legislative Assembly from the Gandhinagar constituency in Jammu district.

References 

People from Jammu
Bharatiya Janata Party politicians from Jammu and Kashmir
Jammu & Kashmir National Conference politicians
Jammu and Kashmir MLAs 1996–2002
Living people
21st-century Indian politicians
Year of birth missing (living people)